The 1978 Cork Senior Hurling Championship was the 90th staging of the Cork Senior Hurling Championship since its establishment by the Cork County Board in 1887. The championship began on 6 April 1978 and ended on 22 October 1978.

St. Finbarr's entered the championship as the defending champions, however, they were beaten by Glen Rovers in the semi-finals.

The final was played on 22 October 1978 at Páirc Uí Chaoimh in Cork, between Blackrock and Glen Rovers, in what was their first meeting in the final in two years. Blackrock won the match by 4-12 to 1-07 to claim their 27th championship title overall and a first title in three years.

Bandon's Pádraig Crowley was the championship's top scorer with 1-25.

Format change

Overview

Since its inception in 1887 the championship had been played on a straight knock-out basis. If any team was defeated at any stage it meant automatic elimination. This system was deemed the fairest as the county champions would always be the team who won all of their games. There were some problems with this system and a special committee was established to examine the standard of competing teams. At the County Convention on 5 February 1978, delegates voted by 143 to 93 in favour of changing the format of the championship.

New format

Section one

Section one comprised the five top-graded club teams. They met each other on a league basis. The two teams to top the league table qualified for the championship semi-finals and each were included on a separate side of the draw. The third team in the section qualified for the championship quarter-final.

Section two

Section two comprised the five remaining club teams. They also met each other on a league basis. The two teams to top the league table qualified for the championship quarter-finals.

Section three

Section three comprised all the divisional and college teams. They played off on a knock-out basis with the winners of the section qualifying for the championship quarter-finals.

Team changes

From Championship

Regraded to the Cork Intermediate Hurling Championship
 Mallow

Declined to field a team.
 Imokilly

Results

Section one

Table

{| class="wikitable" style="text-align:center"
!width=20|
!width=150 style="text-align:left;"|Team
!width=20|
!width=20|
!width=20|
!width=20|
!width=30|
!width=30|
!width=20|
!width=20|
|- style="background:#ccffcc" 
|1||align=left|Blackrock ||4||4||0||0||4-66||8-30||+24||8
|- style="background:#ccffcc" 
|2||align=left|Glen Rovers ||4||3||0||1||7-51||4-40||+20||6
|- style="background:#FFFFE0" 
|3||align=left|St. Finbarr's ||3||1||0||0||6-36||4-41||+1||2 
|-
|4||align=left|Youghal ||3||0||0||3||6-25||6-45||-20||0
|-
|5||align=left|University College Cork ||2||0||0||2||3-10||4-32||-25||0
|-|align=left|
|colspan="10" style="border:0px;font-size:85%;"| Green background The two top-placed teams qualified for the semi-final stage of the championship proper.Yellow background The third-placed team qualified for the quarter-final stage of the championship proper.
|}

Results

Section two

Table

{| class="wikitable" style="text-align:center"
!width=20|
!width=150 style="text-align:left;"|Team
!width=20|
!width=20|
!width=20|
!width=20|
!width=30|
!width=30|
!width=20|
!width=20|
|- style="background:#ccffcc" 
|1||align=left|Sarsfields ||3||2||0||1||9-33||5-30||+15||4
|- style="background:#FFFFE0" 
|2||align=left|Nemo Rangers ||3||2||0||1||9-40||9-30||+10||4
|- style="background:#FFFFE0" 
|3||align=left|Bandon ||3||2||0||1||3-33||5-34||-8||4 
|-
|4||align=left|Na Piarsaigh ||3||0||0||3||2-32||4-44||-18||0
|-|align=left|
|colspan="10" style="border:0px;font-size:85%;"| Green background The top-placed team qualified for the quarter-final stage of the championship proper.Yellow background These teams contested a play-of to determine which of them would enter thechampionship proper, however, they were later thrown out of the championship.
|}

Results

Play-off

Section three

First round

Semi-finals

Final

Knock-out section

Quarter-finals

Semi-finals

Final

Championship statistics

Top scorers

Top scorers overall

Top scorers in a single game

Miscellaneous

 Nemo Rangers and Bandon were disqualified from the championship following a fracas in their section three play-off game. Both clubs were also fined £75 each and a share of the gate receipts, while a number of players subsequently received suspensions.

References

Cork Senior Hurling Championship
Cork Senior Hurling Championship